Sonja Sofia Valfrida Johnsson (later Dymling, 7 August 1895 – 18 June 1986) was a Swedish freestyle swimmer who competed in the 1912 Summer Olympics. She was eliminated in the first round of the 100 m event and finished fourth with the Swedish 4 × 100 m team.

Her nephew Stein competed for Norway in the discus throw at the 1948 and 1952 Olympics.

References

1895 births
1984 deaths
Olympic swimmers of Sweden
Swimmers at the 1912 Summer Olympics
Swimmers from Stockholm
Stockholms KK swimmers
Swedish female freestyle swimmers
20th-century Swedish women